In the ancien Régime French Navy, an officier d'épée (literally, sword officer) was a member of the "corps des officiers d'épée", one of the naval officer corps.  This corps was divided between "officiers de vaisseau" (serving at sea) et "officiers de port" (serving in a port as pilot or in fleet maintenance).  The other main corps was the administrative officier de plume.

See also
Nobles of the Sword

Military ranks of France
Navy of the Ancien Régime